Downers Grove is a 1999 American coming-of-age horror novel by Michael Hornburg. Its plot centers on the last two weeks of teenage girl's life as a high school student growing up in Downers Grove, Illinois. The novel was originally published by William Morrow and Company in 1999, and reprinted in 2001 by Grove Press.

Plot
Crystal Methedrine Swanson, known as Chrissie, is a teenager in Downers Grove, Illinois, about to graduate from high school. Her father has disappeared, while her brother has become a heroin addict, and her mother has begun dating a bizarre man. As her graduation nears, Chrissie and her close friend, Tracey, worry about a curse surrounding the high school that has led to multiple students dying each year. After nearly being raped at a party by one of the school's football players and harassed after, she worries she may become the next victim.

Reception
Publishers Weekly gave the book a positive review, calling the novel "disquieting in its timeliness." Robin Henley of the Chicago Tribune wrote: "If the story and setting sound like territory that has been well-trod, that's because it has been, but what makes this novel a welcome addition to the canon of coming-of-age literature is the voice Hornburg has created for Chrissie. Hornburg knows the rhythms of teenage world-weariness, a self-possessed patter that often belies the terror of straddling the worlds of adulthood and childhood."

Adaptations

The novel was adapted by Bret Easton Ellis into a film in 2015.

References

1999 American novels
American bildungsromans
American horror novels
American novels adapted into films
Fiction about curses
Novels set in Illinois
Novels set in the 1990s
Postmodern novels
Novels about rape
Downers Grove, Illinois